Bertin LeBlanc (born December 28, 1945) is a Canadian politician. He served in the Legislative Assembly of New Brunswick from 1978 to 1982, as a Liberal member for the constituency of Kent South.

References

New Brunswick Liberal Association MLAs
Living people
1945 births